Masayuki Fujita is an electrical engineer at the Tokyo Institute of Technology in Tokyo, Japan.

Fujita was named a Fellow of the Institute of Electrical and Electronics Engineers (IEEE) in 2016 for his contributions to passivity-based control in robotics and robust control.

References 

Fellow Members of the IEEE
Living people
Academic staff of Tokyo Institute of Technology
Japanese electrical engineers
Year of birth missing (living people)